Fantasmas peleándole al viento, is the first DVD of the Argentinian rock band Los Piojos, which was released on March 2, 2006. The recorded live shows were taken from the ones given at the Boca Juniors's Stadium on December 22 and 23, 2005; Estadio Ciudad de La Plata, on November 27, 2004, and Obras Sanitarias Stadium, on October 7, 2005.

Track listing 
 Fantasma
 Babilonia
 Te diria
 Taxi boy
 Pistolas
 Angelito
 Guadalupe (With Rubén Rada)
 Ruleta
 Media caña
 Motumbo
 Marado (With Diego Maradona)
 El viejo
 Morella
 Todo pasa
 Y quemás

External links 
 Fantasmas peleándole al viento

2007 video albums
2007 live albums
Live video albums
Los Piojos albums